Josef Barák (26 January 1833 in Prague – 15 November 1883 in Prague) was a Czech politician, journalist, and poet. He was a member of the Májovci literary group.

See also

 List of Czech writers

External links

1833 births
1933 deaths
Writers from Prague
Czech politicians
Journalists from Prague
Czech poets
Czech male poets
Politicians from Prague